Wichsenstein is a village in the municipality of Gößweinstein in the Upper Franconian county of Forchheim in Germany.

Geography 
Wichsenstein lies high up in the hills of Franconian Switzerland between the city of Nuremberg and the towns of Forchheim and Bayreuth about six kilometres southwest of Gößweinstein and fourteen kilometres east of Forchheim. The Wichsenstein Rock (Wichsensteiner Fels) towers over the centre of the village.

History  
The independent parish of Wichsenstein was disbanded on 1 May 1978. The majority of its more than 500 inhabitants with the villages of Wichsenstein, Altenthal, Hardt, Sattelmannsburg and Ühleinshof were incorporated into the market town (Markt) of Gößweinstein. The villages of Eberhardstein, Pfaffenloh and Urspring with around 50 inhabitants joined Markt Pretzfeld.

Transport 
Wichsenstein is accessible on county roads.

The no. 222 bus links the village to the large county town of Forchheim and the municipal centre of Gößweinstein. On schooldays, there is an extra bus service, no. 226.
In the evenings and at weekends there is a shuttle taxi service (Anrufsammeltaxi).

See also 
 Wichsenstein Castle

References

External links 

Forchheim (district)
Franconian Switzerland
Gößweinstein